The 2019–20 Slovak First Football League (known as the Slovak Fortuna liga for sponsorship reasons) was the 27th season of first-tier football league in Slovakia since its establishment in 1993.

Slovan Bratislava were the defending champions and successfully defended their title, winning their record-extending 10th Slovak title.

Effects of the COVID-19 pandemic
Since March, the season was affected by the COVID-19 pandemic. On 7 March, the 22nd and last round of the regular stage took place. Both the championship group and the relegation group were subsequently supposed to have 10 rounds starting on 14 March. However, the season was interrupted until the end of May. On 22 May, the league committee approved the restart of the competition with a new 5-round model starting on 13 June. The committee also decided that no team would be directly relegated at the end of the season. The last team would face the winner of the 2. Liga in the relegation play-offs.

Decision
The decision was made on 22 May after meeting of the Slovak Presidium of the Union of League Clubs (ÚLK) with representatives of Fortuna League clubs. The continuation of the competition depended on the voting of the clubs. They chose between restarting the league in full format, short format or abandoning the season.

Source: 

Due to hygienic measures, the number of spectators at individual matches was limited. Until 30 June, a maximum of 500 spectators could be present at the stadiums, which, however, also included the teams' staff, the media or stewards. From 1 July, the number of spectators allowed to attend a match was increased to 50% of a stadium's capacity.

Teams
Twelve teams competed in the league – the top eleven sides from the previous season and one team promoted from the 2. liga. The promoted team was Pohronie. They replaced Železiarne Podbrezová.

Stadiums and locations

Personnel and kits

Managerial changes

Regular stage

League table

Results
Each team plays home-and-away against every other team in the league, for a total of 22 matches each.

Championship group

Relegation group

Europa League play-offs
Should one of the top 3 teams win the 2019–20 Slovak Cup, Europa League qualification playoffs will be held among the 4th, 5th, 6th team in the championship group and the top team of the relegation round. On 8 July 2020, Slovan Bratislava, who have won the league title, also won the cup, thus confirming the need of playoffs.

The 4th team play the top team of the relegation group and the 5th play the 6th in the semifinals. Winners of the semifinals play the final to determine the Europa League qualification spot. Europa League qualification playoff games are one-leg and played at the home pitch of the higher-ranked team. The winners qualify for the first qualifying round of the 2020–21 UEFA Europa League.

Semi-finals

Final

Relegation play-offs
The team placed bottom of the relegation group faced the first-placed team from the 2. Liga 2019–20 for a place in the league for the next season.

All times are CEST (UTC+2).

First leg

Second leg

Notes

Position by round
The table lists the positions of teams after each week of matches. In order to preserve chronological progress, any postponed matches are not included in the round at which they were originally scheduled but added to the full round they were played immediately afterwards. For example, if a match is scheduled for matchday 13, but then postponed and played between days 16 and 17, it will be added to the standings for day 16.

Source: Fortunaliga.sk

Season statistics

Top goalscorers

a plus 1 play-off goal

Top assists

Hat-tricks

Clean sheets

Discipline

Player

Most yellow cards: 9
  Martin Šulek (Trenčín)

Most red cards: 2
  Alexander Mojžiš (Ružomberok)

Club

Most yellow cards: 67

FC ViOn Zlaté Moravce

Most red cards: 4
FC Spartak Trnava
ŠKF Sereď

Attendances

Home attendances

Notes

Away attendances

Notes

Awards

Monthly awards

Team of the Season

Team of the Season was:
Goalkeeper:  Dominik Greif (Slovan Bratislava)
Defence:  Jurij Medveděv (Slovan Bratislava),  Myenty Abena (Slovan Bratislava),  Vasil Bozhikov (Slovan Bratislava),  Eric Davis (DAC Dunajská Streda)
Midfield:  Osman Bukari (Trenčín),  Miroslav Káčer (Žilina),  Dávid Holman (Slovan Bratislava),  Zsolt Kalmár (DAC Dunajská Streda),  Moha (Slovan Bratislava)
Attack:  Andraž Šporar (Slovan Bratislava)

Top Eleven U-21
Source:
Goalkeeper:   Martin Jedlička (DAC Dunajská Streda)
Defence:  César Blackman (DAC Dunajská Streda),  Martin Šulek (Trenčín),  Danylo Beskorovainyi (DAC Dunajská Streda),  Alexander Mojžiš (Ružomberok)
Midfield:  Osman Bukari (Trenčín),  Marián Chobot (Nitra),  Abdul Zubairu (Trenčín),  Ján Bernát (Žilina),  Martin Kovaľ (Zlaté Moravce)
Attack:   Milan Ristovski (Nitra)

Individual Awards

Manager of the season

 Ján Kozák jr. (Slovan Bratislava)

Player of the Year

 Dominik Greif (Slovan Bratislava)

Young player of the Year

 Ján Bernát (Žilina)

See also
2019–20 Slovak Cup
2019–20 2. Liga (Slovakia)
 List of Slovak football transfers summer 2019
 List of Slovak football transfers winter 2019–20
 List of foreign Slovak First League players

References

External links

Slovak
2019-20
1